Feriniquarrie is a remote scattered crofting township, situated close to Glendale, on the Duirinish peninsula, in Isle of Skye, Scottish Highlands and is in the Scottish council area of Highland.

The crofting township of Glasphein lies directly to the southeast.

References

Populated places in the Isle of Skye